Tang King Po School is a secondary school in the Ma Tau Wai area of Kowloon City District, in Hong Kong. The school was founded by the Salesians in 1953 with a donation from businessman Tang King Po in 1952.  The school was officially opened at 23 July 1953 by the then-Hong Kong Governor Alexander Grantham.

Early days in 1953
When the school started, it had three classes for the occupation, including 'clothes industry', 'printing Industry' and 'shoes industry'.

Class Structure
Tang King Po School run 31 classes in 2014-2015 academic year. Details are shown below:

Student Performance
Overall, students in this school have excellent performance. All Form 3 students pass the Junior Secondary Education Assessment and the allocation rate to Form 4 is 100%. Percentage of Form 5 students with a passing grade in Hong Kong Certificate of Education Examination is 75%. And the percentage of Form 7 students with a passing grade in Hong Kong Advanced Level Examination is around 70 to 80%. More than 70% of Form 7 graduates obtain a tertiary degree.

In 2005-2006, Form 3 students performed exceptionally well in Territory-wide System Assessment, their English level was way above than the average in Hong Kong, their Chinese level was 2% higher than the average in Hong Kong, and their Math compliance rate was 98%.

99.9% of students in the school year participate in five different types of activities or competitions, including religious, sports, music, academic and interests. Students receives awards in school activities, including academic swimming, basketball, athletics, table tennis, badminton, Music Festival, Speech competition, English Poetry Writing Competition, visual art exhibitions, student physical fitness award program and so on.

Faculty
Current school principal has a master's degree of Education.

Number of Teachers: 75
Ratio of Teacher and Students: Approx. 1 to 18 students

Qualification of Teacher:
 100% had received formal teacher training
 93% with bachelor's degree
 32% with master's degree or above
 87% English teachers were majoring in English; All English teachers have met the requirement of Language Proficiency Assessment for Teachers
 60% English teachers with master's degree

Teaching Experience:
 15 years (23%)
 11–15 years (33%)
 6–10 years (24%)
 1–5 years (20%)

See also
Ma Tau Wai

This school specializes in maths, biology, physics, and chemistry.

External links

Official website
School Information

Ma Tau Wai
Secondary schools in Hong Kong
Salesian secondary schools
Educational institutions established in 1953
Boys' schools in Hong Kong
1953 establishments in Hong Kong